Benjamin Becker was the defending champion but lost to Matthew Ebden 5–7, 6–4, 5–7 in the final.

Seeds

Draw

Finals

Top half

Bottom half

References
 Main Draw
 Qualifying Draw

Aegon Trophyandnbsp;- Singles
2013 Men's Singles